Lützelbach (ˈ) is a municipality in the Odenwaldkreis (district) in Hesse, Germany.

Geography

Location
The municipality lies in the northern Odenwald on the Hesse-Bavaria boundary in a richly wooded setting.

Neighbouring communities
Lützelbach borders in the north on the town of Breuberg and the town of Obernburg, in the east on the towns of Wörth am Main and Klingenberg (all three in Miltenberg district in Bavaria), in the south on the towns of Michelstadt and Bad König and in the west on the community of Höchst.

Constituent communities
Lützelbach’s Ortsteile are Lützel-Wiebelsbach (the municipality's administrative seat), Seckmauern, Haingrund, Breitenbrunn and Rimhorn.

Breitenbrunn, which has 830 inhabitants today, had its first documentary mention in 1273, but is believed to have already arisen by the 11th century.

Politics
The municipal election held in 2001, 2006, 2011 and 2016 yielded the following results:

Mayor
In the runoff election on 27 February 2005, Uwe Olt (SPD) was elected mayor with 56.6% of the vote. He was re-elected in 2011 and 2017.

Honorary citizens
Spiritual Adviser Joseph Klein, as of 16 November 1987 (born 1913 in Bieber (now Offenbach), died 2005)

Culture and sightseeing
Worth seeing is the course of the Neckar-Odenwald Limes with the watchtower foundations and the castrum remains.

References

External links
 Lützelbach’s official page with map 

Odenwaldkreis